Telluride School District (TSD) is a public school system in San Miguel County in southwest Colorado. It consists of four schools, Telluride Elementary, Intermediate, Middle and High.

History

Kyle Schumacher became superintendent in 2011.

On June 30, 2015, he left his post so he could become a superintendent of the LaGrange Elementary School District 102 in the Chicago area, in Illinois.

References

http://tellurideschool.org/

San Miguel County, Colorado
School districts in Colorado